Hymenobacter tibetensis  is an UV-resistant bacterium from the genus of Hymenobacter which has been isolated from the Qinghai-Tibet plateau in China.

References 

tibetensis
Bacteria described in 2014